The Masonic Hall in Wickenburg, Arizona, United States, was built around 1922. It served historically as a clubhouse.

The building "is noteworthy as a rare local example of the concrete frame with brick infill method of construction."

The building was listed on the National Register of Historic Places in 1986. At that time it was the location of a Montgomery Ward department store.

Its Arizona State historic inventory noted that was a "rare local example of Mission Revival architecture" and that it was a demonstration of "unique local use of concrete frame construction."

By June 2011, the building was no longer standing.  Building has been demolished by 2018.

Despite being lost, the building is apparently still listed on the National Register;  no delisting is known to have occurred.

References

Former Masonic buildings in Arizona
Masonic buildings completed in 1922
Buildings and structures in Maricopa County, Arizona
National Register of Historic Places in Maricopa County, Arizona
Demolished buildings and structures in Arizona